Choi Bo-min (born August 24, 2000), professionally known by the mononym Bomin, is a South Korean singer, actor and host. He is a member of Golden Child. He made his acting debut with  a lead role in the web-drama A-TEEN 2 (2019) and hosted the KBS music program Music Bank from July 5, 2019, to July 17, 2020.

Early life
Born on August 24, 2000, in Giheung-gu, Yongin, Gyeonggi Province, South Korea. Bomin attended Hanlim Multi Art School.

Career

2017–present: Debut with Golden Child and solo activities

Pre-debut, in May 2017, Bomin appeared in the MV for Lovelyz single Now, We.

Bomin officially debuted with Golden Child on August 28, 2017, with their first EP Gol-cha!, with a total of six tracks including the title track "DamDaDi". Their debut showcase was held at the Blue Square iMarket Hall on the same day as the album's release.

Bomin made his acting debut in the second season of A-TEEN, playing the role of Ryu Joo-ha. In May, Bomin joined the cast for SBS's reality show Law of the Jungle in Chatham Islands. In June 2019, Bomin was named the official brand model for cosmetics company Lilybyred.

Bomin hosted the music program Music Bank with actress Shin Ye-eun from July 2019 to July 2020. Bomin was cast in the romantic comedy drama Melting Me Softly.

In September 2020, Bomin played the role of Seo Ji-ho in the JTBC fantasy drama 18 Again. In October 2020, Bomin starred in a CF, or commercial film, for the LG Wing.

In February 2021, Bomin was named an official brand model for cosmetics label Etude.

On July 8, 2021, Bomin has been cast in the upcoming drama Shadow Beauty.

On September 29, 2022, his agency announced that he got injured in the face the day before with a wooden club, while he was practicing golf.

Discography

Filmography

Television series

Web series

Variety shows

Awards and nominations

References

External links

 
 

2000 births
Living people
People from Yongin
21st-century South Korean male singers
Woollim Entertainment artists
South Korean male idols
South Korean male pop singers
South Korean male actors
South Korean male television actors
South Korean television presenters
South Korean male web series actors
21st-century South Korean male actors
South Korean television personalities
Hanlim Multi Art School alumni